The following elections occurred in the year 1811.

North America

United States
 1811 New York lieutenant gubernatorial special election

Europe

United Kingdom 

 1811 University of Cambridge Chancellor election

See also
 :Category:1811 elections

1811
Elections